In geometry, a tractrix (plural: tractrices) is the curve along which an object moves, under the influence of friction, when pulled on a horizontal plane by a line segment attached to a pulling point (the tractor) that moves at a right angle to the initial line between the object and the puller at an infinitesimal speed. It is therefore a curve of pursuit. It was first introduced by Claude Perrault in 1670, and later studied by Isaac Newton (1676) and Christiaan Huygens (1693).

Mathematical derivation

Then the puller starts to move along the  axis in the positive direction. At every moment, the thread will be tangent to the curve  described by the object, so that it becomes completely determined by the movement of the puller. Writing that the slope of thread equals that of the tangent to the curve leads to the differential equation

with the initial condition . Its solution is

where the sign  depends on the direction (positive or negative) of the movement of the puller.

The first term of this solution can also be written 
 
where  is the inverse hyperbolic secant function.

The sign before the solution depends whether the puller moves upward or downward. Both branches belong to the tractrix, meeting at the cusp point .

Basis of the tractrix
 
The tractrix might be regarded in a multitude of ways:
 
 It is the locus of the center of a hyperbolic spiral rolling (without skidding) on a straight line.
 It is the involute of the catenary function, which describes a fully flexible, inelastic, homogeneous string attached to two points that is subjected to a gravitational field. The catenary has the equation .
The trajectory determined by the middle of the back axle of a car pulled by a rope at a constant speed and with a constant direction (initially perpendicular to the vehicle).
 It is a (non-linear) curve which a circle of radius  rolling on a straight line, with its center at the  axis, intersects perpendicularly at all times.

The function admits a horizontal asymptote. The curve is symmetrical with respect to the -axis.

A great implication that the tractrix had was the study of its surface of revolution about its asymptote: the pseudosphere. Studied by Eugenio Beltrami in 1868, as a surface of constant negative Gaussian curvature, the pseudosphere is a local model of hyperbolic geometry. The idea was carried further by Kasner and Newman in their book Mathematics and the Imagination, where they show a toy train dragging a pocket watch to generate the tractrix.

Properties

The curve can be parameterised  by the equation .
 Due to the geometrical way it was defined, the tractrix has the property that the segment of its tangent, between the asymptote and the point of tangency, has constant length .
 The surface of revolution created by revolving a tractrix about its asymptote is a pseudosphere.

Practical application
In 1927, P. G. A. H. Voigt patented a horn loudspeaker design based on the assumption that a wave front traveling through the horn is spherical of a constant radius. The idea is to minimize distortion caused by internal reflection of sound within the horn. The resulting shape is the surface of revolution of a tractrix.An important application is in the forming technology for sheet metal. In particular a tractrix profile is used for the corner of the die on which the sheet metal is bent during deep drawing.

A toothed belt-pulley design provides improved efficiency for mechanical power transmission using a tractrix catenary shape for its teeth.  This shape minimizes the friction of the belt teeth engaging the pulley, because the moving teeth engage and disengage with minimal sliding contact.  Original timing belt designs used simpler trapezoidal or circular tooth shapes, which cause significant sliding and friction.

Drawing machines
 In October–November 1692, Christiaan Huygens described three tractrix-drawing machines.
 In 1693 Gottfried Wilhelm Leibniz devised a "universal tractional machine" which, in theory, could integrate any first order differential equation.  The concept was an analog computing mechanism implementing the tractional principle.  The device was impractical to build with the technology of Leibniz's time, and was never realized.
 In 1706 John Perks built a tractional machine in order to realise the hyperbolic quadrature.
 In 1729 Giovanni Poleni built a tractional device that enabled logarithmic functions to be drawn.
A history of all these machines can be seen in an article by H. J. M. Bos.

See also
Dini's surface
Natural logarithm for 
Sign function for 

Notes

References

External links

 
 
 
Tractrix on MathWorld
Module: Leibniz's Pocket Watch ODE at PHASER

Plane curves
Mathematical physics